Supradialect (from Latin , "above", and Ancient Greek , "discourse") is a linguistic term designating a dialectological category between the levels of language and dialect. It is used in two distinctive contexts, describing structural or functional relations within a particular language. As a structural category, supradialects designate the first level of dialectological subdivision within a language, as for example in the pluricentric Serbo-Croatian language, which is divided into three basic supradialects (Shtokavian, Kajkavian and Chakavian), with each of them being further divided into several dialects. As a functional category, supradialect designates a predominant dialectal form within a particular language, referring to the most commonly used variant of that language, accepted in practice by the majority of its speakers as a basic tool of mutual interaction and communication. In that context, such supradialect also functions as an interdialect.

See also 

 Linguistics
 Sociolinguistics
 Dialectology
 Dialect
 Subdialect
 Dialect continuum
 Dialect levelling
 Variety (linguistics)
 Variation (linguistics)
 Common language
 Standard language
 Koiné language
 Interlanguage

Reference

Literature 

 
 
 
 
 Abdullah Hassan, "Pondering on a Malay Supradialect", Dewan Bahasa, 41 (1997), no. 10, p. 911-918.
 Yan Hong-Ming, "On the Supradialectal Function of the Chinese Characters", Journal of Lingnan Normal University, 4 (2002).

Dialects
Language varieties and styles